Newberry is a city located in the southwest corner of Alachua County, Florida, United States. The population was 7,342 as of the 2020 Census. Much of the city borders neighboring Gilchrist County, to the west. The current Mayor is Jordan Marlowe.

Developed as a mining and railroad town in the late 19th century, since the mid-20th century it has developed new commodity crops for agriculture. In 1984 Freddie Warmack was elected as its first black mayor, gaining 60% of the white vote. The city's historic district is listed on the National Register of Historic Places. Since 2019, Newberry's city commission has included a National Development Officer for the right-wing John Birch Society.

History
Newberry developed as a mining town after phosphate was discovered in the western part of Alachua County in the 1880s. In 1893, the Savannah, Florida, and Western Railway was extended southward from High Springs to Newberry, leading to its development as a railroad town and trading center. A post office established in March 1894 was named Newton, but changed to Newberry in August of that year.

In this period, racial violence against blacks rose in Alachua County, where lynchings took place to enforce white supremacy. A total of 21 people, 19 of them black, were lynched in the county between 1891 and 1926.

By 1896 there were fourteen mines operating nearby. Newberry had hotels, boarding houses, and saloons to accommodate the area's transient and sometimes unruly population. The demand for phosphate ended abruptly in 1914 when war was declared against Germany, the principal customer for Newberry's phosphate. This caused a loss of jobs in the area, and social tensions rose.

The community turned from phosphate production to agriculture and new commodity crops. It was particularly successful in producing watermelons. The Watermelon Festival, first held in 1946 in the year after the end of World War II, continues to be celebrated as an annual event.

Race relations have improved in the town since the late 20th century. Residents elected Freddie Warmack as its first black mayor in 1984; he gained 60% of the white vote.

In 1987 Newberry's Historic District was officially listed on the National Register of Historic Places.

Lynchings

On August 19, 1916, what are called the Newberry Six lynchings took place, when three black men, including a minister, and two black women were killed by a white mob in a mass hanging; another man was shot. They had allegedly helped the escape of another African-American man, Boisy Long. He was accused of hog stealing and shooting two men. Filmmaker Patricia Hilliard-Nunn, who is working on a documentary about African Americans in Alachua County, has studied these events. She believes that another three persons may have been lynched in association with the Boisy Long incident, either hanged, as were the Six, or shot to death.

Geography

Demographics

As of the census of 2010, there were 4,950 people, 1,884 households, and 1,383 families residing in the city. The racial makeup of the city was 79.6% White, 14.4% African American, 0.2% Native American, 1.4% Asian, 0.02% Pacific Islander, 2.0% some other race, and 2.3% from two or more races. Hispanic or Latino of any race were 7.2% of the population.

There were 1,884 households, out of which 37.4% had children under the age of 18 living with them, 55.7% were headed by married couples living together, 13.2% had a female householder with no husband present, and 26.6% were non-families. 22.1% of all households were made up of individuals, and 8.0% were someone living alone who was 65 years of age or older. The average household size was 2.63, and the average family size was 3.07.

In the city, the population was spread out, with 25.8% under the age of 18, 6.9% from 18 to 24, 28.9% from 25 to 44, 27.2% from 45 to 64, and 11.1% who were 65 years of age or older. The median age was 36.5 years. For every 100 females, there were 90.3 males. For every 100 females age 18 and over, there were 87.2 males.

For the period 2007–11, the estimated median annual income for a household in the city was $49,623, and the median income for a family was $62,461. Male full-time workers had a median income of $50,990 versus $36,417 for females. The per capita income for the city was $22,851. About 11.5% of families and 18.4% of the population were below the poverty line, including 32.2% of those under age 18 and 12.7% of those age 65 or over.

Notable places 
The City of Newberry is home to both Champions Park of Newberry and the Easton-Newberry Sports Complex. Champions Park of Newberry is one of the premier baseball & softball tournament complexes in the United States today. Attracting more than 30,000 visitors annually for games and tournaments, Champions Park (originally Nations Park) was completed in June 2013 and renamed in May 2014. Located in North Central Florida, Champions Park of Newberry is easily accessible and is conveniently located near Gainesville, Florida. Champions Park has 16 state-of-the-art fields that were built with the player, parent, and family in mind, ensuring that each and every person will have the baseball or softball experience of their dreams.

Easton Newberry Sports Complex, a shared-use facility that combines the Easton Foundation Archery Center with the City of Newberry multiuse Recreation Department, and was selected by the United States Olympic Committee as a Community Olympic Development Program. Easton Newberry Sports Complex is one of only 10 programs nationwide to designated by the USOC for its ability to train coaches and athletes, and provide world-class venues in the sport of archery. The Easton-Newberry Sports Complex serves as a regional archery center for all skill levels, teaching archers the National Training System of USA Archery and giving all interested archers opportunities for advancement. With 100 acres of multipurpose facilities – including dedicated areas for archery training and events – the site currently reaches 6,200 people each year.

Gatorback Cycle Park is an off-road motorcycle park located northeast of the city.

Education
Newberry is served by the School Board of Alachua County, which operates an elementary school, a middle school and Newberry High School in the city, and the Alachua County Library District, which operates a branch library in the city.

In popular culture 
 The city is mentioned in Muddy Waters' song "Deep Down in Florida".
 In the novel Once A Runner by John L. Parker, Jr., the main character goes to Newberry to live in isolation and train for distance running.

References

External links

 City of Newberry official website
 City of Newberry Economic Development Website
 Newberry Jonesville Chamber of Commerce
 History of Newberry
 Dudley Farm Historic State Park

Cities in Alachua County, Florida
Gainesville metropolitan area, Florida
Populated places established in 1889
Cities in Florida
1889 establishments in Florida